The rare earths trade dispute, between China on one side and several countries (led chiefly by the US) on the other, was over China's export restrictions on rare earth elements as well as tungsten and molybdenum. Rare earth metals are used to make lithium ion (li-on) batteries, top of the line neodymium magnets, defense products and many electronics.

The US, EU and Japan argued that the restrictions were a violation of the WTO trade regulations, while China stated that the restrictions are aimed at resource conservation and environmental protection . In 2012, the Obama administration filed a case with the Dispute Settlement Body of the WTO . In 2014, the WTO ruled against China, which led China to drop the export quotas in 2015 .

The 2010 episode generated increased investment in rare earth developments outside China.

Products at issue
There are 17 rare earth metals, and their production is a complex multi-stage process. Exports may be in the form of ores or goods at any stage including mined rare earth ores (all containing a tiny mix of rare earths), refined ore concentrates, refined highly pure metals, or products incorporating refined metals (car li-on batteries, magnets or magnet incorporating windmill generators). Figures given for the various stages are widely undefined as to what level export is being addressed and figures may often be misquoted due to the complexity of the topic. Trade disputes can address country interests over costs, competitive industry positions, or strategic supplies, which all have different relevant export levels and time horizons to consider.

Known reserves of rare earths ores are 120 million tones, with China possessing about one-third of these.

The first stage, the mining process yields rare earth ores. More than 60% of rare earth metals (as of 2019) are mined by China and through controlled entities predominantly in Africa. The second stage is the refining process where ores are separated into some pure metals and some concentrates of light rare earths or heavy rare earth metals. The refining process is highly specific to the nature of the ore and target metals, with concentrates produced intended for other refineries to conduct further refining. China refines 85% refines of the global market share. It refines 68% of nickel globally, 40% of copper, 59% of lithium, and 73% of cobalt.

Production of parts and goods is yet another industrial step performed by many different companies. China produces a large share of these goods and accounts for the majority of the worlds exports, especially lithium ion batteries and neodymium magnets. It accounts for most of the global production of mineral-rich components for battery cells, including 70% of cathodes, 85% of anodes, 66% of separators, and 62% of electrolytes   China holds 78% of the world’s cell manufacturing capacity for EV batteries, which are then assembled into modules that are used to form a battery pack.  The country also hosts roughly 75% of the world’s lithium-ion battery megafactories. This makes China the largest consumer of the minerals it refines.

The rare earth elements (or rare earths) are 17 elements that have magnetic and conductive properties. They are used extensively in electronic gadgets such as cellphones, and in national defense equipment. Despite their name, the elements are not so rare, as they can be found widely. However, they are not often found in economically exploitable concentrations. Their mining is also environmentally hazardous. The rare earths were discovered and first put to industrial use in the United States. But lower labor costs and less strict environmental regulations in China have now enabled the country to be the world's predominant supplier of rare earths.

History of the dispute

China had levied duties and implemented quotas on exporting rare earth elements since 2006 . Dispute arose when the Chinese government reduced its export quotas by 40% in 2010, sending the rare earths prices in the markets outside China soaring . The government argued that the quotas were necessary to protect the environment . Critics charged, however, that the move was protectionism in disguise . The difference in prices inside and outside China gave unfair advantage to Chinese firms .

The American news program 60 Minutes broadcast a segment on the dispute in which the news anchor said that, due to the ubiquity of the use of the rare earths, especially in weaponry, the Chinese restrictions posed a national security threat to the US.

China was accused of unofficially banning of rare earths exports to Japan during a diplomatic standoff between the two countries after the 2010 Senkaku boat collision incident, though China denies such reports. Critics pointed at this incident to argue that China was not above using its dominance in rare earths production to gain leverage in international negotiations.

The WTO case

The US brought a case to WTO's Dispute Settlement Body against the Chinese restrictions. The European Union and Japan also joined the case on the US side. The US argued that the Chinese restrictions were in breach of the accession treaty that China had signed when it joined the WTO in 2001. The treaty disallowed export duties and quotas, except for goods specifically listed. Rare earths were not among the goods specifically listed.

China argued that its restrictions were legal because WTO regulations allow countries to impose export duties and quotas for reasons of conservation and to protect plant, animal, and human safety.

The Dispute Settlement Panel ruled against China. Though the Panel acknowledged that countries are allowed to restrict exports for reasons brought up by China, the Panel was not persuaded that the Chinese restrictions served those reasons. It is true that countries have the right to restrict mining for reasons of conservation and safety, but once the material is out of the ground, WTO member governments could not discriminate between domestic and foreign firms in giving access to the mined resource. China's restrictions gave its domestic firms preferential access to the rare earths, which was against the principle of “non-discrimination” that WTO members are obligated to follow.

Response to the WTO ruling
China expressed disappointment with the ruling (NYT) and filed an appeal repeating its conservation argument. The Appellate panel of the WTO, however, upheld the ruling.  The US Trade Representative hailed the ruling as a victory for openness and fairness around the world. China dropped its export restrictions in January 2015.

As a result of the higher prices China charged outside of China prior to the WTO ruling, many rare earth mining companies in the U.S. and Europe were able to raise capital, and in some instances publicly, through stock sales. Chevron Mining spun off the Molycorp-owned Mountain Pass rare earth mine as a free-standing public company in 2008. However, in response to the WTO action and this growth in competition, China dropped the price of rare earths significantly, making these entities less attractive for investment and, in the case of Molycorp, unsustainable, forcing it into bankruptcy in June 2015. In June 2017, the Molycorp mine was sold out of bankruptcy at auction and was purchased by MP Mine Operations LLC, a company in which Shenghe Resources Holding Co., a Chinese minority shareholder, is granted the exclusive right to market all rare earths from the mine.

In popular culture
The rare earths dispute formed part of the storyline in Season 2 of the Netflix series House of Cards (Real Clear World) and Call of Duty: Black Ops II.

From February to May 2015, the Thyssen Bornemisza Museum ran an art exhibition titled RARE EARTHS related to the dispute, featuring seventeen commissioned works, one for each element. Contemporary artists from The European Union, China, Mexico, Congo and Russia contributed works. Artist and political activist Ai Weiwei was among the artists who contributed.

See also
List of WTO dispute settlement cases

References

World Trade Organization dispute settlement cases
Foreign trade of China